Henri Froment-Meurice (5 June 1923 – 2 July 2018) was a French diplomat and the author of several books. He served as the French Ambassador to the Soviet Union from 1979 to 1982. Later he was the French ambassador to the Federal Republic of Germany.

References

1923 births
2018 deaths
French diplomats
Ambassadors of France to the Soviet Union
Ambassadors of France to Germany
People from Paris